The Lonsdale Football Club was an Australian rules football club originally formed in 1979 as the Mawson Football Club, competing in the Southern Football League Division 2 competition.

Mawson were promoted to the SFL Division 1 competition for one season in 1988 before returning to the Division 2 competition the following season.  Mawson changed its name to the Lonsdale Football Club in 1996 and won the last Division 2 premiership in 2001 before merging with the O’Sullivan Beach Football Club to form the O'Sullivan Beach-Lonsdale Football Club for the following season.

A-Grade Premierships
 Southern Football League Division 2 (2)
 1992, 2001

References

Australian rules football clubs in South Australia
1979 establishments in Australia
Australian rules football clubs established in 1979
2001 disestablishments in Australia
Australian rules football clubs disestablished in 2001